Associazione Sportiva  Real Cesenatico (formerly Associazione Sportiva Dilettantistica Cesenatico Chimicart) is an Italian association football club located in Cesenatico, Emilia-Romagna.

It, in the season 2010–11, from Serie D group F relegated to Eccellenza Emilia-Romagna.

Its colors are red and blue.

In 2000, the sports title was transferred from A.C. Cesenatico S.r.l. to Cesenatico Calcio A.S..

References

External links
Table Team

Football clubs in Italy
Football clubs in Emilia-Romagna
Association football clubs established in 1932
Serie C clubs
1932 establishments in Italy